Amy Jo Bastian  (born 23 July 1968) is an American neuroscientist, who has made important contributions to the neuroscience of sensorimotor control. From 2011 she has been  a professor of neuroscience at  Johns Hopkins University. In 2015 Bastian was appointed Chief Science Officer at the Kennedy Krieger Institute

Education

Bastian completed a B.S. in  Physical Therapy at the  University of Oklahoma  in 1990 and a PhD at Washington University  in 1995 under Dr W. Thomas Thach.

Career
Bastian pursued neuroscience as a postdoctoral researcher (1995–1997) at Washington University before joining the faculty of  Washington University School of Medicine in 1998. in 2001, Bastian joined the  Kennedy Krieger Institute and Johns Hopkins School of Medicine.

Awards and honours
 1999 APTA- Eugene Michels New Investigator Award
 2007 Susanne Klein-Vogelbach Award for Research of Human Movement (Switzerland)
 2007 American Physical Therapy Association- Neurology Section Research Award
 2014 Javits award from the National Institute of Neurological Disorders and Stroke
 2014 Special lecture Society for Neuroscience

Personal life
Bastian is the daughter of  neuroscientist Joseph Bastian,  who worked at the University of Oklahoma,  and his wife Christine Bastian.

Since 2002, Bastian has been married to Ed Connor, who is  a professor of neuroscience at Johns Hopkins School of Medicine and they have one son.

References

External links
 Neurotree
 USA Today 2007
 The Wall Street Journal 2012 
  McGovern Institute annual symposium 2015
 National Public Radio (NPR) 2014: Does the Fight for a Cursive Comeback Miss the Point?

1968 births
Living people
American neuroscientists
American women neuroscientists
University of Oklahoma alumni
Washington University in St. Louis alumni
Johns Hopkins University faculty